Keepers is a live album by American singer-songwriter Guy Clark, released in 1997.

Clark's first live album, Allmusic stated in its review "...it's a better greatest-hits record than any available, since all the songs come from one source, and it's a fine example of how live records should be made."

Track listing
All songs by Guy Clark unless otherwise noted.
 "L.A. Freeway" – 5:54
 "Texas, 1947" – 3:33
 "Like a Coat from the Cold" – 3:17
 "Heartbroke" – 3:45
 "The Last Gunfighter Ballad" – 3:07
 "Better Days" – 3:03
 "Homegrown Tomatoes" – 4:35
 "She Ain't Goin' Nowhere" – 3:38
 "South Coast of Texas" – 4:20
 "That Old Time Feeling" – 4:17
 "A Little of Both" (Clark, Verlon Thompson) – 4:31
 "Out in the Parking Lot" (Clark, Darrell Scott) – 4:35
 "Let Him Roll" – 4:51
 "Texas Cookin'" – 6:00
 "Desperados Waiting for a Train" – 5:19

Personnel
Guy Clark – vocals, guitar
Travis Clark – bass, background vocals
Kenny Malone – drums, percussion
Suzi Ragsdale – accordion, background vocals
Darrell Scott – guitar, dobro, mandolin, dulcimer, slide guitar
Verlon Thompson – guitar, background vocals

Production notes
Miles Wilkinson – producer, engineer, mixing
Johnny Rosen – assistant engineer
Carlos Grier – digital editing
Denny Purcell – mastering
Michael McCall – liner notes
Senor McGuire – photography
Lynne Cook – photography
Sue Meyer – design

References 

Guy Clark albums
1997 live albums
Sugar Hill Records live albums